Petar Alberti (24 August 1771  – 15 May 1822) was a Dalmatian politician that served as the Mayor of Split from 1809 to 1810 whilst Split was part of the Illyrian Provinces.

Sources
 

Mayors of Split, Croatia
1771 births
1822 deaths